Jenny Nowak (born 20 August 2002) is a German nordic combined skier and former ski jumper.

She participated at the individual event at the FIS Nordic World Ski Championships 2021.

Nordic combined results

World Championships

References

External links

Living people
2002 births
German female ski jumpers
German female Nordic combined skiers
Nordic combined skiers at the 2020 Winter Youth Olympics
21st-century German women